The 18th Critics' Choice Awards were presented on January 10, 2013 at the Barker Hangar at the Santa Monica Airport, honoring the finest achievements of 2012 filmmaking. The ceremony was broadcast on The CW and hosted by Sam Rubin. The nominees were announced on December 11, 2012.

Winners and nominees

Favorite Film Franchise
(Public voting category)

The Lord of the Rings
 Batman
 Harry Potter
 Indiana Jones
 James Bond
 Spider-Man
 Star Trek
 Star Wars
 Toy Story
 Twilight

Louis XIII Genius Award
Judd Apatow

Statistics

References

External links
 18th Annual Critics' Choice Movie Awards (2013) – Best Picture: Argo at Critics Choice Association

Broadcast Film Critics Association Awards
2012 film awards